Oakridge High School is a public high school in Oakridge, Oregon, United States. It is the first and only high school in the Oakridge School District.

Academics
In 2008, 78% of the school's seniors received their high school diploma. Of 60 students, 47 graduated, 8 dropped out, 1 received a modified diploma, and 4 are still in high school.

References

High schools in Lane County, Oregon
Public high schools in Oregon